Lahbib Choubani ( - born 1963 in Boujad) is a Moroccan politician of the Justice and Development Party. He held the position of Minister of Relations with the Parliament & Civil Society in Abdelilah Benkirane's cabinet. and also served as MP for Gheris-Tislit constituency since 2002.

Before politics, Choubani worked as a schoolteacher in the province of Errachidia, teaching physics.

Personal life
Choubani is married and father of four children.

See also
Cabinet of Morocco

References

External links
Ministry of Relations with the Parliament

Living people
Government ministers of Morocco
1963 births
People from Boujad
Moroccan schoolteachers
Justice and Development Party (Morocco) politicians
20th-century Moroccan educators